William Terrell Hodges (April 28, 1934 – January 4, 2022) was a United States district judge of the United States District Court for the Middle District of Florida.

Education and career

Born on April 28, 1934, in Lake Wales, Florida, Hodges received a Bachelor of Science in Business Administration from the University of Florida in 1956, and a Juris Doctor from its Fredric G. Levin College of Law in 1958. He was in private practice of law in Tampa, Florida from 1958 to 1971. He was an Instructor in business at the  University of South Florida from 1961 to 1966.

Federal judicial service

Hodges was nominated by President Richard Nixon on December 8, 1971, to the United States District Court for the Middle District of Florida, to a seat vacated by Judge Joseph Patrick Lieb. He was confirmed by the United States Senate on December 11, 1971, and received his commission on December 15, 1971. He served as Chief Judge from 1982 to 1989. Hodges was the Chair of the Judicial Panel on Multidistrict Litigation until June 13, 2007, when his term on that body ended. He assumed senior status on May 2, 1999. Through 2018, he was a member of the Committee on Court Administration and Case Management (CACM) of the Judicial Conference of the United States, which he chaired through October 1, 2018. Hodges died on January 4, 2022.

Notable case
Hodges presided over the 2008 trial of celebrity actor Wesley Snipes for failure to file personal income tax returns (not to be confused with tax evasion). Snipes was convicted on three misdemeanor charges, however Judge Hodges sentenced Snipes to three years in prison and an additional year of probation.

Personal life and death
Hodges died on January 4, 2022, at the age of 87.

See also
 List of United States federal judges by longevity of service

References

Sources
 

1934 births
2022 deaths
20th-century American judges
21st-century American judges
Fredric G. Levin College of Law alumni
Judges of the United States District Court for the Middle District of Florida
United States district court judges appointed by Richard Nixon
University of Florida alumni
University of South Florida faculty
People from Lake Wales, Florida